Naqasheh (also Romanized as Naqāsheh) is a village in Salakh Rural District, Shahab District, Qeshm County, Hormozgan Province, Iran. At the 2006 census, its population was 108, in 26 families.

References 

Populated places in Qeshm County